KEET (channel 13) is a PBS member television station in Eureka, California, United States. Founded in 1969, the station is owned by Redwood Empire Public Television, Inc. KEET's studios are located on Humboldt Hill Road in Eureka, and its transmitter is located along Barry Road southeast of the city.

Technical information

Subchannels
The station's digital signal is multiplexed:

Analog-to-digital conversion
KEET shut down its analog signal, over VHF channel 13, on February 17, 2009, the original target date in which full-power television stations in the United States were to transition from analog to digital broadcasts under federal mandate (which was later pushed back to June 12, 2009). The station's digital signal remained on its pre-transition VHF channel 11. Through the use of PSIP, digital television receivers display the station's virtual channel as its former VHF analog channel 13.

Translators

References

External links
Official website

PBS member stations
EET
Television channels and stations established in 1969
Low-power television stations in the United States
First Nations Experience affiliates